Cornflower is a flowering annual plant Centaurea cyanus.

Cornflower or Cornflowers may also refer to:

Centaurea montana, the perennial cornflower
Chicory, the herbaceous plant Cichorium intybus, also known as cornflower
Psephellus dealbatus, known as Persian cornflower or whitewash cornflower
Brunonia  a perennial or annual herb that grows widely across Australia, commonly known as the blue pincushion or native cornflower
Centaurea depressa, an annual plant native to southwestern and central Asia, known as the low cornflower
Cornflower blue, a shade of medium-to-light blue 
Cornflowers (painting), by Sergei Ivanovich Osipov
HMS Cornflower, multiple ships of the Royal Navy baring this name
Cornflower, a fictional character in the Redwall series of books
Habernitsa a noon demon in Slavic mythology, referred to in English as "Cornflower Wraith"

See also
Cornflour (disambiguation)
Gul Makai (disambiguation) (Urdu for cornflower)
Coneflower